Machine Sazi Arak (MSA) is an Iranian industrial machinery and equipment manufacturing corporation that was established in 1967 in an area of 134 hectares in the city of Arak in order to support underlying industries and meet the industrial needs of the country.

Activities and products 
Some of the activities and products of MSA are as follows: Engineering, procurement, construction, installation of oil, gas, petrochemical, chemical factories, automotive and metal industries and power plant equipment including storage tanks, mobile and fixed pressure vessels, fractionating columns, industrial furnaces, heat exchangers, air coolers, spherical tanks, indirect heat exchangers, mobile oil treating (MOT) units, gate valves and well-head equipment, drilling rigs, process pumps for oil and gas industry, cranes, hydro mechanical equipment for dams, fire tube and water tube boilers as well as combination cycles boilers, bridges and heavy steel structures, production of alloy steels, pressure flanges, industrial rings, axle and railways tires, steel balls, heavy machining industrial furnaces as well as manufacturing machines and plant equipment and industrial incinerators.

With very rapid technological growth of MSA during these years, two reorganizations were performed to manage a wide and varied range of activities.

Groups 
 Equipment Manufacturing Group  
 Metallurgy Manufacturing Group  
 Steam Boiler Manufacturing Group  
 Bridges and Steel Structure Manufacturing Group  
 Machining and Assembly Group

External links

Description of Machine Sazi Arak

Engine manufacturers of Iran
Manufacturing companies of Iran
Engineering companies of Iran
Companies listed on the Tehran Stock Exchange
Iranian brands
Pump manufacturers
Construction and civil engineering companies of Iran
Crane manufacturers
Industrial machine manufacturers
Wind turbine manufacturers
Companies based in Arak
Iranian entities subject to the U.S. Department of the Treasury sanctions

Iran–Soviet Union relations